The Phoronis is a lost ancient Greek epic poem. It told the story of the local Tirynthian culture hero Phoroneus. The author is unknown. Various internal evidence suggest a date between the late seventh and sixth-century BC, although a fifth-century BC date is possible.

Notes

References
 Tsagalis, Christos, Early Greek Epic Fragments I: Antiquarian and Genealogical Epic, Walter de Gruyter GmbH & Co KG, 2017. 
 West, M. L. (2003), Greek Epic Fragments: From the Seventh to the Fifth Centuries BC. Edited and translated by Martin L. West. Loeb Classical Library No. 497. Cambridge, Massachusetts: Harvard University Press, 2003.  . Online version at Harvard University Press.

Ancient Greek epic poems
Lost poems